Stereocaulon is a genus of lichens. Members of Stereocaulon are commonly called snow lichens.

Species
Stereocaulon alpinum 
Stereocaulon apocalypticum 
Stereocaulon arcticum 
Stereocaulon arenarium 
Stereocaulon areolatum 
Stereocaulon argus 
Stereocaulon austroshetlandicum 
Stereocaulon botryosum 
Stereocaulon caespitosum 
Stereocaulon capitellatum 
Stereocaulon cephalocrustatum 
Stereocaulon compactum 
Stereocaulon condensatum 
Stereocaulon corticatulum 
Stereocaulon cumulatum 
Stereocaulon cymosum 
Stereocaulon dactylophyllum 
Stereocaulon delisei 
Stereocaulon depressum 
Stereocaulon evolutum 
Stereocaulon exalbidum 
Stereocaulon exutum 
Stereocaulon fecundum 
Stereocaulon glareosum 
Stereocaulon grande 
Stereocaulon gregarium 
Stereocaulon groenlandicum 
Stereocaulon heardii 
Stereocaulon hypothallinum 
Stereocaulon incrustatum 
Stereocaulon intermedium 
Stereocaulon kangdingense 
Stereocaulon klondikense 
Stereocaulon leucophaeopsis 
Stereocaulon magellanicum 
Stereocaulon myriocarpum 
Stereocaulon nanodes 
Stereocaulon nivale 
Stereocaulon oregonense 
Stereocaulon paschale 
Stereocaulon pileatum 
Stereocaulon plicatile 
Stereocaulon ramulosum 
Stereocaulon rivulorum 
Stereocaulon saxatile 
Stereocaulon sorediiphyllum 
Stereocaulon soufrieranum 
Stereocaulon spathuliferum 
Stereocaulon subcoralloides 
Stereocaulon symphycheilum 
Stereocaulon tomentosum 
Stereocaulon tornense 
Stereocaulon trachyphloeum 
Stereocaulon vesuvianum

References

Lecanorales genera
Stereocaulaceae
Lichen genera
Taxa described in 1796
Taxa named by Georg Franz Hoffmann